The 2013 Pakistani provincial elections may refer to:

2013 Balochistan provincial election
2013 Khyber Pakhtunkhwa provincial election
2013 Punjab provincial election
2013 Sindh provincial election

2013 elections in Pakistan
Provincial elections in Pakistan